The 1896 Idaho gubernatorial election was held on November 3, 1896. Democratic nominee Frank Steunenberg defeated Republican nominee David H. Budlong with 76.79% of the vote.

General election

Candidates
Major party candidates
Frank Steunenberg, Democratic
David H. Budlong, Republican

Other candidates
Moses F. Fowler, Prohibition

Results

References

1896
Idaho
Gubernatorial